Mexico has some traditional games and activities.

Traditional games

Arranca cebollitas 
Arranca cebollitas is a game where participants form a line, with each one standing behind a fellow participant and holding that participant's waist. One opponent attempts to pull the participant at the back of the line away from the rest of the line; if successful, the opponent repeats this until they can remove all players from the line.

Bullfighting 
Bullfighting is an activity introduced to Mexico by the Spanish.

Charrería 
Charrería involves participants going through several equestrian events.

La víbora de la mar

Lotería

Mesoamerican ballgame

Pelota mixteca 
Pelota mixteca is a game somewhat like tennis in which participants strike the ball using a hitting surface attached to their gloved hand.

Pelota purépecha 
Pelota purépecha is a hockey-like game played with a ball that is on fire.

Timbomba 
Timbomba or Kimbomba is a game about hitting a short stick as far as possible using a longer stick held in the hand.

See also 

 Traditional Mexican handcrafted toys

References 

Sports originating in Mexico